Théo Barbet (born 6 March 2001) is a French professional footballer who plays as a defender for Dutch club Almere City.

Career
Barbet started his career with French Ligue 1 side Dijon. In 2020, he was sent on loan to FC Borgo in the French third tier. In 2021, Barbet signed for Croatian club Lokomotiva.

In 2022, he signed for Almere City in the Netherlands. On 12 August 2022, he debuted for Almere City during a 3–0 win over TOP Oss.

References

External links
 

Living people
2001 births
Sportspeople from Mâcon
French footballers
Association football defenders
Championnat National players
Eerste Divisie players
Dijon FCO players
FC Bastia-Borgo players
NK Lokomotiva Zagreb players
Almere City FC players
French expatriate footballers
French expatriate sportspeople in Croatia
Expatriate footballers in Croatia
French expatriate sportspeople in the Netherlands
Expatriate footballers in the Netherlands